Juha Metsäperä (born 1979) is a Finnish pop singer and songwriter. He became known with his debut album Pienen hetken in 2006 and went on tour with his band through Finland, playing 150 gigs in a year. He has also participated in the songwriting and composing songs, including songs in the album Olen lähelläsi. Metsäperä is best known for the song "Äiti" (meaning mother in Finnish) from his album Hyvä sydän.

Discography

Albums

Singles
2009: "Olen lähelläsi"
2012: "Äiti"

References

External links
Official website
Last.fm
Warner Music page

21st-century Finnish male singers
1979 births
Living people
People from Oulu